Achondrostoma oligolepis is a species of cyprinid fish. It is endemic to central and northern Portugal and known from between Limia and Tornada drainages, south of Douro. It occurs in the lower stretches of rivers and streams. It can grow to  total length, although it typically measures about  TL.

Taxonomy
This species was first described as Leuciscus macrolepidotus by Franz Steindachner in 1866, but this name was preoccupied by Leuciscus macrolepidotus Ayres, 1854. Therefore, a new replacement name Chondrostoma oligolepis was given to it in 2005. A later revision placed the taxon in another genus, giving the current combination in use.

References

Achondrostoma
Endemic fish of the Iberian Peninsula
Cyprinid fish of Europe
Fish described in 1866
Fish described in 2005
Taxa named by Maurice Kottelat